The Cardiff Combination Football League is a football league covering the city of Cardiff and surrounding areas in South Wales.  The leagues are at the seventh, eighth and ninth levels of the Welsh football league system.

The most successful club in the league's history is Caerau (Ely), with ten top division titles.

Divisions
The league is composed of three divisions.

Member clubs 2022–23

Premier Division

 Aberystwyth Exiles
 Cardiff Hibernian
 Cardiff Jets
 Cathays Conservatives
 Docks Albion AFC
 Fairwater reserves
 Thornhill AFC
 Tiger Bay AFC

Division One

 Caerau (Ely) 2nds
 Cardiff Hibernian 2nds
 CSKA Sophia Gardens
 Eastern Tigers
 Grange Allstars
 Llanishen Wanderers
 Llanrumney Colts
 Radyr Rangers

Division Two

 Aberystwyth Exiles reserves
 Caerau (Ely) 3rds
 Cardiff Central
 Cardiff Eagles
 Cathays Conservatives reserves
 Cathays United
 CF Roath Lions
 Pontprennau Pumas

Promotion and relegation
Promotion from the Premier Division is possible to the South Wales Alliance League, with the champion of the league playing the other tier 7 champions from the South Wales regional leagues via play-off games to determine promotion.

Champions - Top Division
The top division has been called the Senior Division or Premier Division throughout its history. A full set of the champions can be found below.

1940s

 1940–41: Fairoak
 1941–42: Grange Albion
 1942–43: No competition 
 1943–44: No competition
 1944–45: No competition
 1945–46: Grange Albion
 1946–47: A – Cardiff City Colts;  B – Cogan British Legion
 1947–48: Fairoak
 1948–49: Fairoak
 1949–50: Fairoak

1950s

 1950–51: Fairoak
 1951–52: Cogan
 1952–53: Cogan
 1953–54: Fairoak
 1954–55: Roath Rangers
 1955–56: Roath Rangers
 1956–57: Roath Rangers
 1957–58: The Nomads
 1958–59: Roath Rangers
 1959–60: Roath Rangers

1960s

 1960–61: Roath Rangers
 1961–62: The Nomads
 1962–63: Caerau (Ely)
 1963–64: Bell Rangers
 1964–65: Roath Rangers
 1965–66: Roath Rangers
 1966–67: Roath Rangers
 1967–68: Cardiff Draconians 
 1968–69: Gabalfa Grasshoppers 
 1969–70: Ely Rangers

1970s

 1970–71: Ely Rangers
 1971–72: Cardiff Draconians  
 1972–73: Caerau (Ely)
 1973–74: Cardiff Draconians 
 1974–75: Caerau (Ely)
 1975–76: Ely Rangers
 1976–77: Caerau (Ely)
 1977–78: Ely Rangers 
 1978–79:  Ely Rangers
 1979–80: Cardiff Draconians

1980s

 1980–81: Anthony's
 1981–82: Home Guard (Ely)  
 1982–83: Caerau (Ely)
 1983–84: Caerau (Ely)
 1984–85: Anthony's
 1985–86: Caerau (Ely)
 1986–87: Caerau (Ely)
 1987–88: Fairoak
 1988–89: Caerau (Ely)
 1989–90: Caerau (Ely)

1990s

 1990–91: Whitchurch Hospital Grasshoppers
 1991–92: Gabalfa Draconians 
 1992–93: Gabalfa Draconians 
 1993–94: Whitchurch 
 1994–95: Butetown YC
 1995–96: Butetown YC
 1996–97: Gabalfa Draconians 
 1997–98: Ely West End    
 1998–99: Gabalfa Draconians 
 1999–2000: Cavalier

2000s

 2000–01: AFC St Mellons
 2001–02: Heath Park United  
 2002–03: AFC Butetown
 2003–04: Avenue Hotspur   
 2004–05: AFC Butetown
 2005–06: Baybridge  
 2006–07: Avenue Hotspur   
 2007–08: Thornhill United  
 2008–09: Adamsdown Athletic
 2009–10: STM Sports (promoted)

2010s

 2010–11: Cardiff Hibernians (promoted)
 2011–12: RAFA
 2012–13: Avenue Hotspur
 2013–14: FC Zenith 
 2014–15: STM Sports Old Boys
 2015–16: Thornhill
 2016–17: STM Sports Old Boys
 2017–18: STM Sports Old Boys (promoted to South Wales Alliance League)
 2018–19: Fairwater
 2019–20: Fairwater

2020s 

 2020-21: Not contested - Covid 19 pandemic
 2021-22: Fairwater</ref> (promoted via SWAL playoff)

Number of top flight championships by club

 Caerau (Ely) – 10 titles
 Roath Rangers – 9 titles
 Cardiff Draconians – 8 titles (4 named as Galbalfa Draconians after amalgamation with Gabalfa in 1983–84)
 Fairoak – 7 titles
 Ely Rangers – 5 titles
 Avenue Hotspur – 3 titles
 Fairwater – 3 titles
 STM Sports Old Boys – 3 titles
 AFC Butetown – 2 titles
 Anthony's – 2 titles
 Butetown YC – 2 titles
 Cogan – 2 titles
 Grange Albion – 2 titles
 The Nomads  – 2 titles
 Adamsdown Athletic  – 1 title 
 AFC St Mellons – 1 title 
 Baybridge  – 1 title 
 Bell Rangers – 1 title 
 Cardiff City Colts – 1 title 
 Cardiff Hibernians – 1 title
 Cavalier – 1 title
 Cogan British Legion  – 1 title
 Ely West End – 1 title
 Gabalfa Grasshoppers - 1 title
 Heath Park Avenue – 1 title
 Home Guard (Ely) – 1 title
 FC Zenith – 1 title
 Rafa – 1 title
 STM Sports – 1 title
 Thornhill – 1 title
 Thornhill United – 1 title
 Whitchurch – 1 title
 Whitchurch Hospital Grasshoppers – 1 title

References

External links
 Cardiff Combination League

8
Sport in Cardiff
1939 establishments in Wales
Sports leagues established in 1939